Kimmo Muurinen (born February 23, 1981) is a Finnish professional basketball player. He played the most years of his career in his home country Finland, but also had stances in Germany, Italy and the United States. He is also a long time member of the Finnish national team, which he played for since 2000. As of September 2, 2014, he has played 153 games for Finland.

Honours
Korisliiga: 2013
Finnish Cup: 2009
Korisliiga Rookie of the Year: 2001

References

External links
Profile – Eurobasket.com

1981 births
Living people
Finnish expatriate basketball people in the United States
Finnish men's basketball players
Little Rock Trojans men's basketball players
Nilan Bisons players
Sportspeople from Vantaa
Power forwards (basketball)
Skyliners Frankfurt players
Torpan Pojat players
2014 FIBA Basketball World Cup players